Bulbine namaensis is a species of plant in the genus Bulbine. It is native to Namibia and to the Cape Provinces in South Africa.  Its natural habitat is dry savanna.

References

Flora of the Cape Provinces
Flora of Namibia
namaensis
Least concern plants
Plants described in 1902
Taxonomy articles created by Polbot